UNSW-Eastern Suburbs Bulldogs is an Australian rules football club competing in the Sydney AFL competition. They are based in the Eastern Suburbs of Sydney, and affiliated with the University of New South Wales.

History

The club formed in 1999 out of the merger of the Eastern Suburbs Australian Football Club with the University of New South Wales Australian National Football Club, but its origins are traced back to the East Sydney Australian Football Club, New South Wales' first Australian Rules club in 1880.

Eastern Suburbs Football Club

When talking about the history and personalities of East Sydney Football Club, the name of Frank Dixon is the first to come to mind. He was an outstanding player and coach, and was also Deputy Lord Mayor of Sydney. A plaque dedicated to his memory is displayed on the grandstand at Trumper Park.

Over the years, many distinguished names have played for East Sydney, including Les Darcy (the champion boxer), Victor Trumper (the famous cricketer and who Trumper Park in Paddington is named after), and Sam Loxton (former Australian cricket selector, and leading Easts' goal kicker during the 1945 season). Also, the Co-Founder of the VFL, L.W. Hedger, was a prominent Easts' player during the 19th century. A number of prominent Australians also played junior footy with Easts, including Kevin Ashley and Kevin Junee (who both went on to play rugby league for Australia).

Our club has been blessed with a number of loyal and dedicated people over the years, including some current Life Members Jack & Joy Dean, Kevin & Kay Ryan, Michael 'Raffles' Blaumschein, and Paul Constance (who came to the club in 1974, from Carlton), not to mention the contribution from the UNSW people, like Phillip Holmes, Ken Fowlie, and others.

In the 1950s a renaissance began for East Sydney with the arrival from WA of Roy Hayes. Roy played 303 games for the Bulldogs and was a member of the premiership winning sides between 1953 and 1959. He also won the Best & Fairest Award for 3 consecutive years (1952-53-54); he was the only Easts' player to be selected for an all-Australian side, and was undoubtedly an East Sydney legend.

The 50s era, with seven successive senior premierships, was East Sydney's most successful. Some of the stars of that period were Jack and Mal Dean, Alan Elliott, Don Wilson, Ron Dempsey, Max Stoutt, Roy Hayes, Fred Pemberton, Ron Baker, Kevin Little, Joe Hughes, and Alf Penno (who coached Easts to three successive flags between 1956–58).

The 1960s were leaner years for Easts, but the club produced a number of great players, including Paul Paitry, Brian 'Toby' Tyler (who twice won the coveted Phelan Medal), and won the Best & Fairest in 1968-69-71. The following list of names may also bring back a few memories; Ken Kilpatrick, Alan Gray, Fred Verco, Kevin Little, Billy Ayton, Bob Jones, Brian Ratcliffe, Terry Stone, Graham Summers, Alan Grentel, Ron Fitzpatrick, Bob and Garry Wilton, John Roberts (who played over 500 senior games for Easts including over 300 in first grade, and whose son, Brett, is a current senior player with the club), Graham Mckenzie, Bob Carter, Jack Hamilton, Keith Liddelow, Robert Schobel, Bob Hankinson, Tony Buck, Peter Onley, Michael Camilleri, Ted Sharpe, and Dennis Pangrazio.

1968 saw Jack Hamilton win the League goal kicking with 87 goals. In 1969 Bill Quinn took over as coach, and Brian Tyler won the Phelan Medal.

Jack Dean became President in 1970, and held the position for eleven years. Jack played 231 games for the Bulldogs and was one of the stars of the 1950s and 1960s, representing NSW on countless occasions, and coaching Easts in 1961. Jack was 37 when he finished his football career, playing for Sydney Naval.

Cliff Matson who spent his earlier years with University of NSW, where he was awarded a prestigious University 'Blue' award and went on to captain UNSW, coached the 1971 senior team to their first premiership in over a decade. Laurie Dunlop kicked an amazing seven goals in that Grand Final, playing from a half-forward flank, while Wally Dahler, Bill Skipper, Kevin Smith, Peter Thorpe, Paul Paitry, Keith Liddelow, and Brian Taylor played a major part in the victory.

East Sydney played Western Suburbs in five consecutive Grand Finals from 1971-1975, which were highlighted by all-in brawls at the beginning of each match. Matson coached Easts in four of these Grand Finals, with Kevin Pearson coaching the successful 1973 side.

In 1971, promising young Easts' player Mark Maclure played for NSW Under 19s, and also won the Kealey Medal (for Best & Fairest in the League Reserves). In 1973 Mark was signed by Carlton, where he had a distinguished career playing 244 first grade games, including two AFL premierships, as well as captaining the mighty Carlton Blues. Mark's brother, Steve 'Bomber' Maclure is another colourful character to have played with Easts during this period.

The 1973 premiership side was laden with talent, and many went on to become Sydney AFL legends, including Paul Paitry, Cliff Matson, Kevin Pearson, Garry McAuliffe, Russell Hughes, Ian 'Champ' Allen, Bill Skipper, Wally Dahler, Bruce 'Bones' Hill, Ray Weston, Garry Towle, Alex Peden, Ron Fitzpatrick, Bob Wilton, Rod Schobel, and Keith Liddelow.

Easts were runners-up to Wests in 1974 and 1975, but in 1976 bounced back to another premiership victory under the guidance of the legendary Austin Robertson, defeating North Shore by 13 goals. There was a glut of talent in this team, including Bob Claridge (who won the club Best & Fairest that year, and went on to win the Phelan Medal in 1979), Wayne Goss, Paul Bouchier, Ron Williams, Graham Foster, and Grant Luhrs, combining with champions Ian Allen, Bill Skipper, Russell Hughes, and Wally Dahler. Wayne Goss came from Tasmania, and played well over 200 games for Easts, including 6 premierships, and NSW state representation on several occasions.

In 1977 Russell Hughes coached the Bulldogs without success, while Peter Physick won the goal kicking, with 63 goals (Peter is currently President of East Coast Eagles club). Bob Claridge took over the coaching in 1978, and the Bulldogs made the finals, only to be beaten by St George in the first semi-final.

1979 saw Alex Ruscuklic (former Fitzroy and Carlton star player) appointed as coach, and his professional attitude to the sport made a big impression on the club, and they remained unbeaten throughout the season until the finals series, losing to North Shore in the Grand Final. Alex's brother, Peter, was the find of the season; he played only three seasons with Easts, but he won the league goal kicking in every year he played, with 136 goals in 1979, 153 in 1980, and a record 213 goals in 1981. He was also awarded the Best & Fairest in 1979 and 1981.

1980 was the Bulldogs 'Centenary Year', and Easts wore a special Guernsey for that occasion (white, with red and blue bands). It was also the first of another five consecutive First Grade premierships. The First Grade side was coached by Austin Robertson, and the Reserves by the legendary John Roberts. Easts made the finals in every grade, with both the Firsts and Reserves winning their premierships. Easts also won the League goal kicking in all 3 grades. Peter Ruscuklic kicked 153 goals in First Grade, Geoff Spalding kicked 47 in Reserves, and Andy Bell kicked 51 in Third Grade. It was a bumper year for East Sydney, and the first time that a Sydney AFL game was televised live and played on the SCG. Wayne Hardie, in his first year with the club, just missed out on the Phelan Medal by one vote, his brother Brad won the Brownlow Medal in 1986, with Footscray (now the Western Bulldogs). The First Grade created a League record when they annihilated North Shore by 121 points! The scores were; Easts: 30.24 [204]; North Shore: 12.11 [83]. It was the highest score, and the highest winning margin in a Grand Final. The First Grade team included Ted Pleming (now a sponsor of the club), Graeme Foster, Steve Byrnes, Enzo Corvino, Ian Allen, Grant Luhrs, Rob Claridge, Geoff Spaulding, Ian Geddes, Jim Richardson, Peter Ruscuklic, Laurie Axford, Phil Ingles, Brendan Higgins, Wayne Hardie, Wayne Goss, Jeff Carruthers, Danny Stakelum, James O'Callaghan and Stuart Allen.

For the 1981 season, John Todd became Club President, and Greg Harris was appointed captain coach, which proved to be very effective, with Easts going on to win successive premierships. Greg Harris was a dynamic leader with a capacity to motivate and communicate effectively with players. He generated enthusiasm and loyalty within the club and won the respect of every follower of the code in Sydney. Easts lost to Newtown in the second semi-final, but had their revenge in the Grand Final with a convincing 89-point victory. In all, 1981 was a memorable year for the Bulldogs, with Laurie Axford winning the Phelan Medal, and Peter Ruscuklic winning the goal kicking with 213 goals.

The 1982 season culminated in a close fought battle for Grand Final honours against Pennant Hills, with Easts emerging victors by 3 goals, with the ageing Ian Allen taking out the Best & Fairest award.

In 1983 the First Grade side remained undefeated throughout the season, with Geoff 'Hammy' Spaulding taking out the goal kicking with 105 goals. The Grand Final victory over Balmain was Easts' 27th senior premiership (including those of Paddington prior to the 1926 merger). Final scores were Easts: 18.23 [131] def Balmain: 15.3 [93], with best players being Jim Richardson, Peter Stanton, Wayne Goss, Mark Phillips, Trevor Bailey, and Geoff Spaulding. Easts also won the Reserves Grand Final, defeating North Shore by 18 points.

In 1984 Bill Quinn took over as President, and Wayne Goss was captain-coach. It was a very successful year, with the Bulldogs winning both the First and Reserves Grand Final for the second year in a row. The First Grade Final score was Easts: 13.4 [82] def North Shore: 9.8 [62], with best players being Neil Ward, Danny Upfal, Phil Reid, Garth Harris, Jim Richardson, Geoff Luff, and Paul Bounader. Easts defeated North Shore by 20 points in the Reserves Grand Final.

Greg Harris returned as captain-coach in 1985, but it was to be a disappointing final year for Greg, who was undoubtedly one of the finest coaches in Sydney football, with the First Grade being beaten by North Shore in the first semi-final. Greg has not only been one of the greatest Sydney AFL footballers to lace on a boot, but he also has the distinction of playing Rugby for Australian touring sides to America, Canada, the British Isles, Japan, Russia, and Europe, and in 1978 joined the Cronulla Sharks Rugby League team as a second rower in their senior team. Greg also coached the Sydney Swans Thirds, and held the role of Chairman of Selectors at the Swans for a number of years, including the Swans' Grand Final year of 1996. He was also instrumental in the recruiting of Tony Lockett to Sydney.

Under the tutelage of Greg Harris the Bulldogs would also reach the Grand Final of the First Division in 1988 only to be defeated by Campbelltown. An unfortunate run of injuries on the day prevented any real chance East Sydney had of claiming the title. That was also the year that music icon Paul Kelly played with the Doggies – albeit every now and then in the twos - and even penned a song in Los Angeles (where he was recording) that he sent to Triple J for the team that was played over the public address system on Grand Final day at Erskineville Oval.

1979-1984 was a special period for East Sydney, with the First Grade losing only a handful of games, and winning five premierships along the way. This successful period in Easts' history produced many great players, including Peter Ruscuklic, Neil Ward, Jim Richardson, Wayne Goss, Ian Allen, Laurie Axford, Darren Jennings, Grant Luhrs, Ian Geddes, Ian Martin, Les Mildenhall, Peter Stanton, Geoff Spaulding, Greg Harris, Geoff Luff, Mark Phillips, Danny Uphal, Phil Reid, Mike Boyce, Enzo Corvino, Trevor Bailey, and Garth Harris.

Following the five successful premierships in the period 1980-1984, East Sydney went through a tough period, but the Bulldog spirit remained, and the club continued to be competitive. In this period the club continued to produce some champions, including Ian Roberts (who joined the club from the Sydney Swans), Neil Cordy (the former Footscray and Sydney Swans player, who went on to TV Sports Presenter with Channel 10), Chris O'Dwyer, who played AFL level football with the Sydney Swans, and went on to win a Phelan Medal in the Sydney AFL, as well as captain and coach the Bulldogs in their final years at Trumper Oval, leading up to the merger with the University of New South Wales in the summer of 1999/2000. It was during this period that current club stalwart and legend, Brad Abbott, joined the club, from the Central Coast, and went on to captain premiership success in 2002. Another quality player during this period was tough cop, and NSW representative, Kenny Howe, who had previous playing experience in the Riverina and ACT.

UNSW Australian National Football Club

UNSW has its own proud history, with the 'Wallies' formed in 1962, and going on to win nine First Grade premierships in the SFA, during which time it produced its own list of stars, including Cliff Matson and Stuart Cadzow (who both won University 'Blues', and both went on to play with Easts).

The University of New South Wales Australian National Football Club was formed on 22 March 1962.  The club intended on sending a team to Adelaide for intervarsity that year but did not because only 18 players were available instead of the required 22.  1963 was the club's first year of active participation.  The club came fifth at intervarsity, which was held in Sydney, and Denis Aitken and Ian Sharpe were selected to play in an All Australian Universities side against NSW.  Ian was unfortunate enough to be injured after five minutes in that game but Denis spearheaded the Combined Universities win with eight goals.  We also defeated Sydney University in an inaugural match for a perpetual trophy donated by Shell.

In 1964, UNSW's players competed in regular competition for the first time in a combined Universities side with Sydney University. The club also fielded a team at intervarsity in Perth, which created headline stories.  Some unnamed players almost depressurised their plane by puncturing holes in the window seals and many players jumped from one side of the plane to the other trying to get it to roll.

From 1965, it was decided that the combined Universities side be separated and the club commenced regular competition for the first time as the University of New South Wales in first division, with a team in reserve grade only. In 1966, the club played its first game under lights against Sydney University in the annual Shell Cup game.  We won this game for the fourth year in a row. 1966 was also the club's first premiership year. The team was promoted to first grade in 1969 after four consecutive grand final appearances from 1965–68, which included two premierships. The 1968 premiers won by 97 points.

In 1970, the leagues were restructured and the club fielded two sides in the second division competition.  The leagues in Sydney have changed many times since then, expanding to three small divisions in 1971 and consolidating to two large divisions in 1994.  Since 1970, the club has always competed in second division with at least two grades.

After the season of 1987 the club officially folded.  A meeting of the committee was held and the proposal was put to the vote.  It was carried with two dissenters. The vote was later determined to be unconstitutional, however the two dissenters left the meeting and agreed to take on the organisation of the club and to field two teams in 1998.

The club has produced many representative players.  In 1964, John Ward was selected in the State side and he and Cliff Matson were selected in the Australian Universities side. In 1966, Graham McKenzie was selected in the Australian Universities side. Cliff Matson won the League best & fairest three years in a row from 1966–68 and, in 1969, was elected captain of the State side and awarded best player in a match against a Victorian side.
In 1968, Cliff Matson, Kevin Williams, Chris Herbert and Ron Haley represented the club in the State second grade team.  In 1970, Brian Lawn kicked over 100 goals and in 1971 kicked 94. In 1973, Lyn Davis represented the club in the State Second Division team and was adjudged the best & fairest player in the series against Newcastle and South Coast.  In 1976, when UNSW hosted intervarsity, Albert Suidgeest, Andy Collins, Peter Hurst, Alan Abbot, Ian Geddes and Col Kay were all selected in the intervarsity representative side.  Ian Geddes was runner-up best & fairest for the carnival.

In 1985, Dale Rolfe was equal 1st in the League's Reserve grade best & fairest after the club lodged an appeal.  Apparently R Dale was awarded best on ground in one game, which was eventually awarded to Dale Rolfe.  In 1988, Beres Dowdle was selected in the All Australian university side.  In 1989, Richard Beissel was selected in the All Australian university side and Paul Annett won the League's best and fairest.  Paul then won a Ben Lexcen Scholarship the following year.

In 1990, John O'Dwyer won the League reserve grade best and fairest award.  In 1994, Steve Driscoll won the League Reserve grade best & fairest.  In 1995, the club had five players selected in Australian University Games' Green and Gold team.  They were Matt Hern, Merrick Kingston, Justin Loveridge, Shayne McKenzie, and Alex Opie.  In 1995 and 1996, Stephen Byrns won the League best & fairest and Dan Hupfau won the League's reserve grade best & fairest award. In 1996, the club recruited a very talented player in Stuart Cadzow and he was awarded the Ben Lexcen Scholarship, which was renewed in 1997. Also in 1996, Andrew Chaplin was selected in the Australian Universities Green and Gold team.

The club has won five first grade premierships in 1971, 1972, 1977, 1993 and 1994 and won nine reserve grade premierships in 1966, 1968, 1972, 1973, 1976, 1977, 1990, 1995 and 1996.  The club's most successful year at the University Games was in 1995, winning a bronze medal by defeating Monash University in Darwin.

In 1985, the club set an Australian record for the highest score recorded by a senior grade team in an Australian National Football game with a score of 69 goals and 32 behinds (446 points) against Baulkham Hills who did not score a single point. The record was beaten in 1986 by Killarney Vale on the Central Coast and then by Victorian club Campbell's Creek in 1990, but the University club recaptured the New South Wales record in 1994 with a score of 81 goals and 49 behinds (535 points) against Blacktown who scored only one point, which was scored by Rod Bordignon's man.

External links

 
 

University of New South Wales student organisations
Australian rules football clubs in Sydney
University Australian rules football clubs
1999 establishments in Australia
Australian rules football clubs established in 1999